Ken Jautz serves as executive vice president, CNN-US, responsible for HLN, as well as group operations, business affairs and the Newsource affiliate service. Jautz, a longtime CNN and Turner Broadcasting executive, has managed several networks, including HLN, CNNfn and n-tv, a German national news channel.

Biography
Jautz graduated from Cornell University and the Columbia University Graduate School of Journalism.

Jautz was a local newspaper reporter and a foreign correspondent for The Associated Press before becoming CNN's bureau chief in Germany. Among the stories he covered for the network were the fall of the Berlin Wall and subsequent revolutions in East European countries; the 1991 Gulf War; the dissolution of the Soviet Union; and the break-up of Yugoslavia and resulting Balkan conflicts. From 1995 to 2000, Jautz worked for Turner Broadcasting Europe, first as a London-based business development executive helping launch news channels and programs in several European countries, then as the Berlin, Germany-based managing director of n-tv, which operated the first all-news television network in Germany. Jautz served as executive vice president of CNN's business news unit from 2001 to 2004, during which time he managed the CNNfn network, helped launch the CNNMoney website, and oversaw all business programming on CNN/U.S., including several award-winning weekday and weekend business programs.

In September 2010, he was named by Jim Walton, the president of CNN Worldwide, as president of CNN/U.S. programming replacing Jonathan Klein. Scot Safon was named as his replacement. He served until 2013. During his tenure, the network commissioned its first non-fiction series from outside producers and received critical acclaim for its commitment to international reporting, including a Peabody award and Emmy award for coverage of the Arab Spring in 2011. From 2005 to 2010, Jautz was responsible for HLN where he revamped and re-branded the network formerly known as CNN Headline News and created a host of new shows that cumulatively posted record ratings for the network, including Morning Express with Robin Meade, Nancy Grace, Showbiz Tonight and Joy Behar.

Personal life
He is married with two children.

References

External links 
Profile at CNN

CNN executives
Living people
Cornell University alumni
Columbia University Graduate School of Journalism alumni
Year of birth missing (living people)